is a retired Japanese volleyball player. He was a member of the Japanese Men's National Volleyball Team that claimed the bronze medal at the 1964 Summer Olympics in Tokyo, Japan.

References
sports-reference

1935 births
Living people
Japanese men's volleyball players
Olympic volleyball players of Japan
Olympic bronze medalists for Japan
Volleyball players at the 1964 Summer Olympics
Olympic medalists in volleyball
Asian Games medalists in volleyball
Volleyball players at the 1958 Asian Games
Volleyball players at the 1962 Asian Games
Medalists at the 1964 Summer Olympics
Medalists at the 1958 Asian Games
Medalists at the 1962 Asian Games
Asian Games gold medalists for Japan
20th-century Japanese people